Blood of Dragons is a fantasy novel by American writer Robin Hobb, the fourth and final book in The Rain Wild Chronicles. It was released in March 2013 and is a direct continuation of the previous novel: City of Dragons.

References

2013 American novels
2013 fantasy novels
Novels by Robin Hobb
HarperCollins books
Novels about dragons